Kim Ji-young (born Kim Hyo-sik on September 25, 1938 – February 17, 2017) was a South Korean actress.

Filmography

Film

Television series

Book

Awards and nominations

References

External links
 
 
 

1938 births
2017 deaths
South Korean film actresses
South Korean television actresses
South Korean stage actresses
People from Chongjin
Deaths from lung cancer
20th-century South Korean actresses
21st-century South Korean actresses